The 2016 F4 Spanish Championship was the inaugural season of the Spanish F4 Championship, a motor racing series regulated according to FIA Formula 4 regulations, taking place in Spain and Portugal. The championship featured drivers competing in 1.4 litre Tatuus-Abarth single seat race cars that conformed to the technical regulations for the championship. The series was organised by Koiranen GP and RFEDA. It began on 11 June at the Circuito de Navarra and finished on 16 October at the Circuito del Jarama after 20 races held across seven rounds.

MP Motorsport driver Richard Verschoor dominated the season and sealed the title after taking hat-trick at Jarama. While his team won the teams' championship. Aleksandr Vartanyan finished as runner-up to Verschoor, despite missing a round, but Vartanyan wasn't able to win a race. Tuomas Tujula won a race at Navarra and completed the top-three in the driver standings. Verschoor's teammate Xavier Lloveras won a race at Barcelona and helped MP Motorsport to clinch their first teams' championship in their history. Nikita Volegov and Tuomas Happalainen were the only other drivers who were eligible to score points due to obligation of competing in at least five rounds. Wildcard drivers Jarno Opmeer, Sebastián Fernández, Juuso Puhakka, Juho Valtanen, Roope Markkanen have visited a podium step (Markkanen won the second race at Navarra).

Entry list

Race calendar and results

The calendar was announced on 10 March 2016. A mid-season change was introduced with the round in Jerez being replaced by Montmeló and ran as a double-header in support of the World Rallycross Championship. But on 12 July calendar was amended again. Estoril round was changed to Jerez, where it was be in the support of the Formula V8 3.5 Series and Euroformula Open Championship. While Barcelona round was moved to 2 October and supported Blancpain GT Series Sprint Cup.

Championship standings

Points were awarded to the top 10 classified finishers in each race. No points were awarded for pole position or fastest lap. At Montmeló, only two races were held, and full points were awarded for Race 2. Only drivers, who have competed at least in five rounds were eligible to score championship points.

Drivers' championship

Teams' championship

References

External links
 

Spanish F4 Championship seasons
Spanish F4
F4 Spanish Championship
Spanish F4